Chris or Christopher Pearson may refer to:

 Chris Pearson (boxer) (born 1990), American boxer
 Chris Pearson (politician) (1931–2014), first premier of the Yukon
 Christopher Pearson (Vermont politician) (born 1973), Vermont state legislator
 Christopher Pearson (journalist) (1951–2013), Australian journalist
 Christopher Pearson (footballer), Jamaican footballer